James Christopher Harrison  (born 27 December 1936), also known as the Man with the Golden Arm, is a blood plasma donor from Australia whose unusual plasma composition has been used to make a treatment for Rhesus disease. He made over 1,000 donations throughout his lifetime, and these donations are estimated to have saved over 2.5 million babies from the condition. On 11 May 2018, he made his 1,173rd donationhis last, as Australian policy prohibits blood donations from those past age 81.

Early life 
James Harrison was born on 27 December 1936. In 1951, at the age of 14, he underwent major chest surgery, requiring a large amount of blood. Realising that the blood had saved his life, he made a pledge to start donating blood himself as soon as he turned 18, the then-required age.

Blood plasma donations 

Harrison started donating in 1954. After the first few donations, it was discovered that his blood contained unusually strong and persistent antibodies against the D Rh group antigen. The discovery of these antibodies led to the development of immunoglobulin-based products to prevent haemolytic disease of the newborn (HDN). These products, which contain a high level of anti-D antibodies are given to Rh(D) negative mothers of unknown or Rh(D) positive babies during and after pregnancy to prevent the creation of antibodies to the blood of the Rh(D) positive child. This antigen sensitisation and subsequent incompatibility phenomenon causes Rhesus disease, the most common form of HDN.

Through the donations of his plasma, Harrison has helped prevent thousands of children from dying of HDN. The following research based on his donations created the commercial Anti-D immune globulin commonly known as RhoGAM.

His donations were estimated to have helped save over 2.4 million babies, with pregnant women, including his own daughter Tracey, being treated with his antibodies.

As blood plasma, in contrast to blood, can be donated as often as once every two weeks, he was able to reach his 1000th donation in May 2011. This results in an average of one donation every three weeks during 57 years. Commenting on his record, he said: "I could say it's the only record that I hope is broken, because if they do, they have donated a thousand donations."

Research is on to synthetically create a mixture of antibodies that matches what Harrison's body produces naturally. The project is called "James in a Jar".

Advocacy 
In 2007, Harrison was critical of plans to open up Australia's plasma donation to foreign corporations. He believes that opening up the trade will discourage volunteer donations. This opening of trade stemmed from a review of the country's free trade agreement with the United States.

Honours 
Harrison was awarded the Medal of the Order of Australia (OAM) on 7 June 1999. In 2011, he was nominated in the New South Wales Local Hero division of the Australian of the Year awards.

References 

1936 births
Living people
Australian philanthropists
Blood donation
Recipients of the Medal of the Order of Australia